Go Back to China is a 2019 drama film written and directed by Emily Ting. It stars Anna Akana as Sasha Li, a trust fund wannabe designer whose father pressures her to go to Shenzhen to learn the family business. The film is semi-autobiographical and is based on Ting's life and relationship with her father.

Go Back to China premiered at the 2019 SXSW Film Festival. The film had a limited release in the United States on March 6, 2020. The website's critics consensus reads: "Uneven but entertaining, Go Back to China puts a refreshing cross-cultural spin on the traditional coming-of-age story arc."

Plot
Sasha Li is a recent fashion grad living in L.A. who is unable to find work and lives off of a lucrative one million dollar trust fund given to her by her estranged father, a Chinese manufacturer who mass-produces plushies.

On her birthday Sasha learns that her father has cut off access to her trust fund so that she will come work for the family business in China. When that doesn't work, her father cuts off alimony payments to her mother, forcing Sasha to capitulate.

In Shenzhen, Sasha reunites with her older half-sister Carol (Lynn Chen) and her younger siblings born from her father's affair with one of his workers. To her disgust, she also learns that his latest girlfriend, Lulu, is near her age.

Sasha joins her older sister Carol in working for her father at his toy factory. After attending a sales pitch where buyers tell her father his products are dated, Sasha takes her father's designers to Hong Kong to look at products and get new ideas.

Sasha gets her father's approval to design a unique looking toy collection for Christmas which ends up selling well. When Carol and Sasha go out to celebrate, Carol reveals that their father was still married to her mother when Sasha's mother began an affair with him, and over the years, he had many affairs and pressured many of his girlfriends to have abortions.

The Christmas toy collection moves forward under Sasha's guidance. She makes a modification to one of the items on the toy, exchanging a plain fabric scarf for a sequinned one, only to learn that the sequins represent a choking hazard, and she has already ordered the scarf fabric in extensive quantities. Sasha's father and Carol decide to go forward with production anyway only to have the product recalled after a child does choke on it. After her father screams at her, Sasha abruptly quits. Carol begs her to stay as she planned to finally leave their domineering father and leave Sasha as her substitute. Sasha refuses and urges Carol to stop seeking their father's approval and become independent.

Sasha returns to L.A., despondent over the recalled toys. Her friends suggest that she give one of the recalled toys to a child social influencer to review and the ensuing popularity causes her father's distributor to withdraw their recall and re-issue the toy without the scarves. Impressed with Sasha's design and marketing skills they also hire her to work for them.

Sasha receives a visit from Carol and learns she has finally quit the company and decided to live life on her own terms. Returning to China on a business trip Sasha visits her father and suggests he use what's left of her trust fund to provide child care for his factory workers to boost morale. She also offers to continue designing toys for him freelance, which he accepts.

Cast
 Anna Akana as Sasha Li
 Richard Ng as Teddy Li
 Lynn Chen as Carol Li
 Kelly Hu as May Li
 Aviva Wang as Dior Li
 Tiger Ting as Christian Li
 Kendy Cheung as Lulu
 Taryn Look as Tracy
 Brittany Renee Finamore as Jessica
 Christina Thomas as Renee

References

External links
 

2019 drama films
2019 films